Alejandro Chacín (born June 24, 1993) is a Venezuelan professional baseball pitcher for the Wild Health Genomes of the Atlantic League of Professional Baseball. He has played in Major League Baseball (MLB) for the Cincinnati Reds.

Career

Cincinnati Reds
On February 23, 2010, Chacín signed a minor league contract with the Cincinnati Reds organization. In 2011 and 2012, Chacín played for the Rookie Ball AZL Reds and Billings Mustangs. Chacín spent the 2013, 2014, and 2015 seasons with the Single-A Dayton Dragons, also spending part of 2015 with the Advanced Single-A Daytona Tortugas. He spent the 2016 season with the Double-A Pensacola Blue Wahoos, and was invited to Spring Training for the 2017 season. Chacín was assigned to the Triple-A Louisville Bats to begin the season, and was called up to the majors for the first time on August 23, 2017. On October 4, 2017, Chacín was outrighted and elected free agency on November 6, 2017. Chacín signed with the Sugar Land Skeeters of the Atlantic League of Professional Baseball in early 2018. His contract was purchased by the Cincinnati Reds on May 23, 2018. Chacín elected free agency on November 2, 2018.

Lancaster Barnstormers
On March 13, 2019, Chacín was traded to the Lancaster Barnstormers of the Atlantic League of Professional Baseball. He became a free agent following the season.

Southern Illinois Miners
On March 11, 2020, Chacin signed with the Southern Illinois Miners of the Frontier League.

Wild Health Genomes
On June 2, 2022, Chacin signed with the Wild Health Genomes of the Atlantic League of Professional Baseball.

References

External links

1993 births
Living people
Arizona League Reds players
Billings Mustangs players
Cincinnati Reds players
Dayton Dragons players
Daytona Tortugas players
Lancaster Barnstormers players
Louisville Bats players
Major League Baseball pitchers
Major League Baseball players from Venezuela
Navegantes del Magallanes players
Pensacola Blue Wahoos players
Sportspeople from Maracay
Sugar Land Skeeters players
Tigres de Aragua players
Venezuelan expatriate baseball players in the United States
Venezuelan Summer League Reds players
Leones del Caracas players